Sir Walter Scott is an outdoor bronze portrait statue of Walter Scott and the writer's favorite dog Maida by John Steell, located in Central Park in Manhattan, New York. The memorial sculpture, a replica of the 1845 original in Edinburgh's Scott Monument, was cast in 1871 and dedicated on November 27, 1872. It was donated by resident Scottish-Americans.

References

External links

 

1871 establishments in New York (state)
1871 sculptures
Bronze sculptures in Central Park
Scott, Walter
Scott, Walter
Scott, Walter
Dogs in art
Monuments and memorials in Manhattan
Outdoor sculptures in Manhattan
Sculptures in Central Park
Sculptures of men in New York City
Statues in New York City
Scott, Walter
Walter Scott
Sculptures of dogs in the United States